The Mississippi Synodical College is a historic building in Holly Springs, Mississippi, USA. Formerly a religious college, it is home to the Marshall County Historical Society and Museum.

Location
The building is located at 220 College Avenue in Holly Springs, a small town in Northern Mississippi.

History
The building was built to house the Mississippi Synodical College in 1903. It was designed as a three-storey, hip-roofed building made with red bricks. The college was merged with Belhaven College in 1939. Meanwhile, a Classical Revival building on the east side was razed.

The building is now home to the Marshall County Historical Society and Museum.

Architectural significance
As a contributing property to the East Holly Springs Historic District, it has been listed on the National Register of Historic Places since April 20, 1983. It is also a Mississippi Landmark.

References

Buildings and structures in Holly Springs, Mississippi
University and college buildings completed in 1903
University and college buildings on the National Register of Historic Places in Mississippi
National Register of Historic Places in Marshall County, Mississippi
1903 establishments in Mississippi